Tzahalon is a residential neighborhood of Jaffa, Israel. It is located just south of central Jaffa and just east of the Ajami neighborhood. Notable buildings include the music hall the East West House, featuring world music on a regular basis.

The neighborhood has been noted for its steady population.

References

Neighborhoods of Tel Aviv